Department of Computer Science at Aarhus University is with its 1000 students the largest Computer Science Department in Denmark. Earlier, the department abbreviation was 'DAIMI’, but after a restructure and internationalization, the abbreviation of the department became CS AU, short for Department of Computer Science, Aarhus University.

History 
Originally, Department of Computer Science was a section within Department of Mathematics at Aarhus University. Here, the department was abbreviated DAIMI, short for Datalogisk Afdeling i Matematisk Institut, and by 1998 the name DAIMI had become so well known that it was kept, when the department became an independent department.

The computer science course started at Aarhus University in 1971 as part of Department of Mathematics. During the period 1993-1998 the computer scientific subject area underwent rapid growth, and at the department the total number of staff members rose from 80 to 160, primarily because of an increase in external funding.

An independent Department of Computer Science was founded in 1998. In the coming 5–6 years the department continuously moved more sections to new buildings as part of Aarhus University's plan to concentrate IT activities within the IT City Katrinebjerg. Close working relations to other organizations within the IT City have been established, i.e. with Department of Aesthetics and Communication and the Alexandra Institute.

Well-known computer scientists from Department of Computer Science, Aarhus University include:

 Bjarne Stroustrup (inventor of C++)
 Jakob Nielsen (expert in usability)
 Lars Bak (inventor of the V8 JavaScript Engine)

Education 
Educations at Bachelor level:
 Bachelor in Computer Science
 Bachelor in IT (Information Technology)
Educations at Master level:
 MSc in Computer Science
 MSc in IT Product Development
 MSc in Information Technology

Additionally, the department offers a number of continuing and further education courses.

Research 
 Algorithms and Data Structures
 Bioinformatics
 Complexity Theory
 Computer Graphics and Scientific Computing
 Cryptography and Security
 Human Computer Interaction
 Modelling and Validation of Distributed Systems
 Object-Oriented Software Systems
 Programming Languages and Formal Models

Professors 
 Lars Arge
 Susanne Bødker
 Lars Birkedal
 Ivan Bjerre Damgård
 Kaj Grønbæk
 Christian S. Jensen
 Kurt Jensen (CPN Tools)
 Morten Kyng
 Ole Lehrmann Madsen
 Brian H. Mayoh
 Peter Bro Miltersen (P/poly)
 Mogens Nielsen (Petri net)
 Michael I. Schwartzbach

The IT City Katrinebjerg 
The department is located in the Aarhus region named Katrinebjerg. The area also hosts many IT companies as well as other institutes of education and is known as the IT City Katrinebjerg.

External links 
 Department of Computer Science, Aarhus University 
 Magazine about the Dept. of Computer Science, Aarhus University (2009)
 Research areas at CS

Founded: 1971 (section) / 1998 (department)
Head of Department: Lars Birkedal
City: Aarhus
Country: Denmark
Number of students: Approximately 1000
Website: cs.au.dk

Aarhus University